Calgary Outlaws may refer to:
 Calgary Outlaws (baseball)
 Calgary Outlaws (basketball)